Northridge is a census-designated place (CDP) in Starr County, Texas, United States. This was a new CDP for the 2010 census with a population of 78.

Geography
Northridge is located at  (26.413767, -98.996472).

References

Census-designated places in Starr County, Texas
Census-designated places in Texas